The 2014 National Women's Soccer League season is the second season of the National Women's Soccer League, the top division of women's soccer in the United States. Including the NWSL's two professional predecessors, Women's Professional Soccer (2009–2011) and the Women's United Soccer Association (2001–2003), this is the eighth overall season of FIFA and USSF-sanctioned top division women's soccer in the United States. The league is operated by the United States Soccer Federation and receives major financial backing from that body. Further financial backing is expected to be provided by the Canadian Soccer Association and the Mexican Football Federation. All three national federations pay the league salaries of many of their respective national team members in an effort to nurture talent in those nations.

The regular season began the weekend of April 12–13 and ended August 20, with the championship game played on August 30. FC Kansas City defeated the Shield winners Seattle Reign FC 2–1 to win the NWSL title.

The league had announced it would not expand for the 2014 season and was not expected to contract. However, after a push from the Houston Dynamo, the league approved the expansion of the Houston Dash.

Teams, stadia, and personnel

Stadia and locations 

See also List of National Women's Soccer League stadiums

Two teams, the Dash and Reign, do not make their stadia's entire capacity available for home games, instead restricting ticket sales at a lower level. The full capacities of their venues are included in parentheses and italics.
The Boston Breakers,

FC Kansas City,

and Seattle Reign FC

moved to new stadia for 2014, while the Houston Dash was an expansion franchise.

Personnel and sponsorship 

Note: All teams use Nike as kit manufacturer.

Player Acquisition 

Players were acquired through the 2014 Allocation of national team players announced on January 3, the 2014 NWSL Expansion Draft (for expansion team Houston) on January 10, and the 2014 NWSL College Draft on January 17, as well as free agency, trading, and loans.

Notable acquisitions

  Christen Press, top scorer of the 2013 Damallsvenskan in Sweden, was allocated to Chicago.
  Nahomi Kawasumi, named Best Player of the 2013 L. League in Japan, was loaned to Seattle from INAC Kobe Leonessa.
  Beverly Goebel, top scorer of the 2013 L. League in Japan, was loaned to Seattle from INAC Kobe Leonessa.
  Kim Little, PFA Women's Players' Player of the Year for 2012–13 and top scorer of the 2012 FA WSL in England, was signed as a free agent by Seattle.
  Verónica Boquete, Player of the Year of the 2011 WPS in the U.S., was signed as a free agent by Portland, arriving June 7.

Competition format 

 Each team will play a total of 24 games, 12 home and 12 away. Each teams will play four opponents twice at home and once away, and will play the other four opponents once at home and twice away.
 The four teams at the end of the season with the most points will qualify for the playoffs. The two semi-final games will be played on the weekend of August 23–24, and the final will be played on August 30.

Results table 

Scores listed as home-away

League standings

Tiebreakers 

The initial determining factor for a team's position in the standings is most points earned, with three points earned for a win, one point for a draw, and zero points for a loss. If two or more teams tie in point total, when determining rank and playoff qualification and seeding, the NWSL uses the following tiebreaker rules, going down the list until all teams are ranked.

If two teams tie:

 Head-to-head win–loss record between the two teams.
 Greater goal difference across the entire season (against all teams, not just tied teams).
 Greatest total number of goals scored (against all teams).
 Apply #1–3 to games played on the road.
 Apply #1–3 to games played at home.
 If teams are still equal, ranking will be determined by a coin toss.

If three or more teams tie, the following rules apply until only two teams remain tied, at which point the two-team tiebreakers listed above are used:

 Points per game against all other tied teams (total all points earned in games against tied teams and divide by games played against tied teams).
 Greater goal difference across the entire season (against all teams, not just tied teams).

Positions by gameweek 

Considering each week to end on a Sunday

Positions by games played

NWSL Playoffs 

The top four teams from the regular season qualified for the championship playoffs. The highest-seeded semi-final winner then hosted the championship final.

Semi-finals

Championship

Attendance

Average home attendances

Ranked from highest to lowest average attendance.

A new NWSL attendance record of 19,123 was set on August 3 in a game between Portland and Houston at Providence Park in Portland, breaking the previous record of 17,619 set in 2013.

Playoff Attendance 

Semi-final No. 1, August 23, Portland at Kansas City: 2,997

Semi-final No. 2, August 24, Washington at Seattle: 4,540

Final, August 31, Kansas City at Seattle: 4,252

Statistical leaders

Top scorers 

<small>Source:

Top assists 

Source:

|}

Goalkeeping 

(Minimum of 1,080 Minutes Played)

Source:

Individual awards

Weekly awards

Monthly awards

Annual awards

Statistics

Scoring 

 First goal of the season: Amy Rodriguez for FC Kansas City against Sky Blue FC (April 12)
 Earliest goal in a match: 33 seconds
 Jessica McDonald for Portland Thorns against Chicago Red Stars (July 17)
 Latest goal in a match: 90+4 minutes
 Yael Averbuch for Washington Spirit against Chicago Red Stars (August 2)
 Widest winning margin: 6 goals
 FC Kansas City 1–7 Portland Thorns FC (July 13)
 Most goals scored in a match: 9
 Portland Thorns FC 6–3 Boston Breakers (July 20)
 First Own Goal: Amy Barczuk of Western New York Flash for Washington Spirit (April 13)
 Average goals per match: 2.98

Hat-tricks

Discipline 

 First yellow card: Allie Long for Portland Thorns FC against Houston Dash (April 12)
 First red card: Lisa de Vanna for Boston Breakers against Sky Blue FC
 Most yellow cards in a match: 9
 Seattle Reign FC 3–1 Chicago Red Stars – 4 for Seattle and 5 for Chicago
 Most yellow cards: 6
 Courtney Jones (Boston Breakers)

Streaks 

 Longest winning streak: 7 games
 Seattle Reign FC, games 1–7
 FC Kansas City, games 11–17
 Longest unbeaten streak: 16 games
 Seattle Reign FC, games 1–16
 Longest winless streak: 8 games
 Houston Dash, games 17–24
 Longest losing streak: 6 games
 Houston Dash, games 19–24
 Longest shutout: 587 minutes by Nicole Barnhart for FC Kansas City
 Longest drought: 379 minutes for Houston Dash

See also 

 List of top-division football clubs in CONCACAF countries
 List of professional sports teams in the United States and Canada

References 

 
2014
1